Gaoyi is a town in and the seat of Gaoyi County, in southwestern Hebei province, China, about  south of the provincial capital of Shijiazhuang. , it has 24 villages under its administration. It is directly serviced by China National Highway 107 and just off of G4 Beijing–Hong Kong and Macau Expressway.

See also
List of township-level divisions of Hebei

References

Township-level divisions of Hebei
Gaoyi County